Harriet Lee (1757 – 1 August 1851) was an English novelist and playwright.

Life
She was born in London in 1757.  After the death of her father, John Lee, in 1781, she aided her sister Sophia Lee in keeping a private school at Belvedere House, Bath.

In 1786, she published The Errors of Innocence, a novel in five volumes, written in epistolary form.  A comedy, The New Peerage was performed at Drury Lane on 10 Nov. 1787, and, although acted nine times, was not successful enough to encourage her to continue writing for the stage. Genest calls it 'on the whole a poor play'.  It was published with a dedication to Thomas King the actor, who had taken the chief part. The younger Bannister, Suett, and Miss Farren were also in the cast.  Richard Cumberland wrote the prologue.  Clara Lennox, a novel in two volumes, was published in 1797 and translated into French in the following year.  The five volumes of Lee's chief work, Canterbury Tales, were published between 1797 and 1805. In 1798, she published a play in three acts, The Mysterious Marriage, or the Heirship of Rosalva. It was never acted.

Before 1798, William Godwin made Lee's acquaintance during a ten days' sojourn at Bath, and was so greatly struck with her conversation – he made elaborate analyses of it – that he determined to offer her marriage.  From April to August 1798, they carried on a correspondence.  But Godwin's egotism displeased Harriet, and she frankly rebuked his vanity.  Godwin again visited Bath at the end of 1798 and paid her formal addresses, but Lee finally decided that his religious opinions made a happy union impossible (Godwin is considered one of the first exponents of utilitarianism and the first modern proponent of anarchism).  Her last letter, 7 August 1798, expressed a hope that friendly intercourse might be maintained; and Godwin sent letters to her at a later date criticising some of her literary productions.

Among other of her friends were Jane and Anna Maria Porter, the novelists, who lived at Bristol, and Thomas Lawrence. It is said that Sophia and Harriet Lee were the first to predict the future eminence of Sir Thomas Lawrence, who presented to them portraits by himself of Mrs. Siddons, John Kemble, and General Paoli.  Samuel Rogers mentions meeting Harriet Lee in 1792.  She lived to the great age of ninety-four, and was remarkable to the last for her lively conversational talents, clear judgment, powerful memory, and benevolent and kindly disposition.  She died at Clifton, Bristol, 1 August 1851.

Influence on Byron

Canterbury Tales (1797–1805), Lee's best-known work, consists of twelve stories, related by travellers thrown together by untoward accident - obviously modeled on Geoffrey Chaucer's well-known work of the same name. The book fell into the hands of Lord Byron when he was a boy. 'When I was young (about fourteen, I think),' he writes in the preface to Werner, regarding one of the tales, 'Kruitzner,' 'I first read this tale, which made a deep impression upon me, and may, indeed, be said to contain the germ of much that I have since written. In 1821 Byron dramatized 'Kruitzner,' and published it in 1822 under the title of 'Werner, or the Inheritance.' In the preface he fully acknowledges his indebtedness to Harriet Lee's story, stating that he adopted its characters, place, and even its language. Lee had already dramatized her story at an earlier date, under the title of The Three Strangers and on the publication of Byron's dramatic version she sent her play to the Covent Garden Theatre (November 1822); but although the piece was accepted, the performance was postponed by her own wish till 10 Dec. 1825, when it was acted four times. The cast included James Prescott Warde, Charles Kemble, and Mrs. Chatterley. John Genest describes it as 'far from bad.' It was published in 1826

Notes

References
Attribution

Sources
 British Authors Before 1800: A Biographical Dictionary, edited by Stanley J. Kunitz and Howard Haycraft, New York, The H. W. Wilson Company, 1952.
 April Alliston, 'Lee, Harriet (1757/8–1851)', Oxford Dictionary of National Biography, Oxford University Press, 2004, accessed 13 November 2006
 Rebecca Garwood, 'Sophia Lee (1750–1824) and Harriet Lee (1757–1851)' at www.chawton org
 
 Harriet Lee, from Wikinfo
 This article on her sister also has a paragraph on Harriet Lee.

1757 births
1851 deaths
English women novelists
English women dramatists and playwrights
19th-century English women writers
Writers from Bristol
18th-century British women writers